Bethlehem Records was an American jazz independent record label, founded by Gus Wildi in 1953.

History
Bethlehem is remembered for its jazz releases from the 1950s. Producers included Creed Taylor and Teddy Charles. Bethlehem released the first albums recorded by singers Chris Connor (the dual releases Chris Connor Sings Lullabys for Lovers and Chris Connor Sings Lullabys of Birdland) in 1954, Nina Simone (Little Girl Blue) in 1958, and singer/actress Julie London. Julie London recorded four songs that were released on the EP Julie London, and they were later added to the compilation LP Bethlehem's Girlfriends in 1955, which also featured Chris Connor and Carmen McRae. Bethlehem recorded the debut album by Marilyn Moore and the album Somebody Loves Me by Jerri Winters, in addition to many many modern jazz musicians including Howard McGhee, Herbie Nichols, Pat Moran McCoy, and Oscar Pettiford.

In 1958, Bethlehem began a distributing deal with King Records. In 1962, Bethlehem Records was sold and absorbed by King Records. After Syd Nathan's death in 1968, King was acquired by Starday Records and relaunched as Starday and King Records. It was purchased in 1970 by Lin Broadcasting and in 1972 by Tennessee Recording & Publishing, until acquired by Gusto Records in 1974. At that time, Bethlehem was purchased by the Cayre brothers' Salsoul Records, who initially intended to release its back catalog for inexpensive 8-track tapes in the 1970s. By 1993, the Bethlehem name was revived as Bethlehem Music Company, although Salsoul is often used as an imprint. The Verse Music Group obtained its licensing in 2010. In 2015 BMG acquired the catalog of Verse Music, including the Bethlehem label.

During 2013–2014, Verse and Naxos reissued the 1950s catalogue on LP, CD, and digital download. This included music by Art Blakey, Chris Connor, Paula Castle, John Coltrane, Dexter Gordon, Nina Simone, Mel Tormé, and Zoot Sims.

Selected acquisitions 
In 1956, Period Records sold its jazz LP catalog (10 disks) to Bethlehem. Production of all its jazz recordings were supervised by Leonard Feather.  Several of the Period recordings had been previously released by Jazztone for mail-order club release.

Discography

BCP 1000 Series
The BCP 1000 Series of 10 inch LP records commenced in September 1954 and ran until July 1955 when the label switched to 12 in LP releases.

BCP 12-Inch "Deluxe" Series
The BCP "Deluxe" Series of 12 inch LP records commenced in 1955 and ran until 1960. Early releases consisted of reissues of 10 inch albums from the BCP 1000 Series.

5000 series
The 5000 series of 12 inch LP records commenced in 1957 but only released six albums.

6000 series
The 6000 series of 12 inch LP records commenced in 1956 and ran until 1964.

See also 
List of record labels

References

External links
The Pictorial Discography of 1000 Series
Bethlehem Discography

Jazz record labels